K. S. Soundaram is a poet, researcher and politician from the All India Anna Dravida Munnetra Kazhagam who represented Tiruchengode in the 10th Lok Sabha.

Early life
Born on 2 June 1946 in Erode district, K. S. Soundaram attended the Seethalakshmi Ramaswami College, Tiruchirapalli; PSG College of Arts and Science and Bharathiar University. She holds M.A., M.Phil. and Ph.D. degrees. The topic of her thesis was Dramatic Aspects in Kalithogai.

Career
Soundaram is known for her research work on Tamil literature. In 1972, she became a member of the All India Anna Dravida Munnetra Kazhagam (AIADMK) and cites M.G. Ramachandran and J. Jayalalitha as her inspiration. She contested the 1991 Indian general election from Tiruchengode constituency on the ticket of AIADMK and obtained 5,21,580 votes while her nearest rival, K. P. Ramalingam of Dravida Munnetra Kazhagam received 2,07,099. The number of votes she polled was the highest one a candidate received and her victory margin of 3,14,481 votes was the highest one in South India for that general election.

Personal life
Soundaram married Prof. R. Arumugam on 9 June 1969. Together they have two sons.

References

1946 births
Living people
Women members of the Lok Sabha
India MPs 1991–1996
Lok Sabha members from Tamil Nadu
People from Erode district
People from Namakkal district
20th-century Indian women
20th-century Indian people